Stropping may refer to:
Stropping (blade), a finishing step in sharpening a blade
Stropping (syntax), a way of marking words as special in a programming language